August "Gus" Schumacher (born July 25, 2000) is an American cross-country skier. In 2020, Schumacher became the first American to win a gold medal in an individual race at the Junior World Ski Championships. He competed in the 30 kilometre skiathlon at the 2022 Winter Olympics.

Early life
Schumacher was born in Madison, Wisconsin and grew up in Anchorage, Alaska. He learned to ski as soon as he could walk, using strap-on skis in his backyard. By the time he reached middle school, Schumacher had begun to show an interest in competitive racing. After moving through the ranks with the Anchorage Junior Nordic League, he joined the Alaska Winter Stars program. He graduated from Service High School in 2018 and is currently enrolled as a part-time student at the University of Alaska Anchorage in pursuit of a Civil Engineering degree.

Athletic career

High school and juniors
As a high school student, Schumacher trained with the Alaska Winter Stars. He swept both individual races at the Alaska state high school championships to claim the title of Skimeister, awarded to the skier with the best combined times, in both 2017 and 2018.

From 2015 to 2019, Schumacher competed at the Cross Country Junior National Championships with the Alaskan divisional team.

Cross-country skiing results
All results are sourced from the International Ski Federation (FIS).

Olympic Games

Distance reduced to 30 km due to weather conditions.

World Championships

World Cup

Season standings

References

External links

Gus Schumacher at International Ski Federation
Gus Schumacher at U.S. Ski and Snowboard

2000 births
Living people
American male cross-country skiers
Cross-country skiers at the 2022 Winter Olympics
Olympic cross-country skiers of the United States
Sportspeople from Madison, Wisconsin
Tour de Ski skiers